Paspalum laeve common name field paspalum, is a plant found in North America. 

It is listed as threatened in Connecticut. Paspalum laeve var. circulare, common names round field beadgrass and hairy field beadgrass, is endangered in New York (state).

References

Flora of North America
laeve